"679" is the second single by American rapper and singer Fetty Wap from his self-titled debut album. The song features the Remy Boyz (Monty and former member, P-Dice). "679" peaked at No. 4 on the US Billboard Hot 100, becoming his second highest-charting single after "Trap Queen". The album version of the song omits P-Dice's verse, featuring only Monty. The Remy Boyz version is included on his 2014 mixtape Up Next.

Background and release
"679" was released on June 29, 2015. The name ''679" comes from Wap's birthday, which is June 7, 1991 (6/7/1991). Wap stated that he considers "679" to be his best song so far. Wap and Monty performed the song on The Tonight Show Starring Jimmy Fallon in September 2015.

Genius pointed out the similarity between "679" and the Chainsmokers' "Closer" in September 2016, claiming that the songs' choruses are nearly identical, with the only major difference being that Fetty's is in B minor and the Chainsmokers' is in A-flat major. Genius even cut together a video of the choruses playing over each other.

Composition
"679" is a hip hop song. It was written by Fetty Wap and Remy Boyz. The song was produced by Brian "Peoples" Garcia.

Music video
The video for "679" was released to the WorldStarHipHop official YouTube channel in May 2015. It was later uploaded to Fetty Wap's YouTube channel in July 2015 and has over 430 million combined views as of May 2020.

Commercial performance
"679" was the highest-ranking debut on the Billboard Hot 100 for the chart dated July 18, 2015, entering the chart at number 34. Its chart debut was fueled by first-week digital download sales of 86,000 copies as well as 3.4 million domestic streams. The following week, it jumped to number 19, earning the biggest gain in streams on the chart. "679" became Wap's third top 10 hit in the United States during the year of 2015, when it reached number eight on the chart dated September 5, 2015, and peaked at number four. As of February 2016, "679" has sold 1,830,064 copies domestically.

Charts and certifications

Weekly charts

Year-end charts

Certifications

References

External links

2014 songs
2015 singles
Fetty Wap songs
Songs written by Fetty Wap
300 Entertainment singles
Songs about parties